Manuel de Vecchi is an Italian racing cyclist who represents Italy in BMX. He has been selected to represent Italy at the 2008 and 2012 Summer Olympics in the men's BMX event.

References

External links
 
 
 
 
 

1980 births
Living people
BMX riders
Italian male cyclists
Olympic cyclists of Italy
Cyclists at the 2008 Summer Olympics
Cyclists at the 2012 Summer Olympics
Cyclists from the Province of Verona